Rachel Howard (born 30 November 1977) is an association football goalkeeper who represented New Zealand at international level.

Howard made her Football Ferns debut in a 0–5 loss to the United States on 28 May 1998, and represented New Zealand at the 2007 FIFA Women's World Cup finals in China, where they lost to Brazil 0–5, Denmark (0-2) and China (0-2). Howard was one of only 3 squad members to not get any playing time in the Tournament.

Howard was also included in the New Zealand squad for the 2008 Summer Olympics where they drew with Japan (2-2) before losing to Norway(0-1) and Brazil (0-4). Again, Howard failed to get playing time at the tournament with Jenny Bindon being first choice goalkeeper.

References

External links
 

1977 births
Living people
New Zealand women's international footballers
New Zealand women's association footballers
Women's association football goalkeepers
Olympic association footballers of New Zealand
Footballers at the 2008 Summer Olympics
2007 FIFA Women's World Cup players
University of Auckland alumni
New Zealand expatriate sportspeople in Germany
Expatriate women's footballers in Germany